In regression analysis, partial leverage (PL) is a measure of the contribution of the individual independent variables to the total leverage of each observation. That is, if hi is the ith element of the diagonal of the hat matrix, PL is a measure of how hi changes as a variable is added to the regression model. It is computed as:

where
j = index of independent variable
i = index of observation
Xj·[j] = residuals from regressing Xj against the remaining independent variables

Note that the partial leverage is the leverage of the ith point in the partial regression plot for the jth variable. Data points with large partial leverage for an independent variable can exert undue influence on the selection of that variable in automatic regression model building procedures.

See also
 Leverage
 Partial residual plot
 Partial regression plot
 Variance inflation factor for a multi-linear fit

References

External links
 Partial Leverage Plot, Dataplot manual, Statistical Engineering Division, National Institute of Standards and Technology

Regression diagnostics